Susedgrad Castle (Hungarian: Szomszédvár), or earlier also only Sused, is a ruined medieval fortress on the far-western hill of mount Medvednica, while also marking the far-western part of modern-day Zagreb, Croatia.

Position 
As written on billboard near Susedgrad ruins, the fortress overwatched an important crossroad at Krapina-Sava confluence, and therefore enabled control over nearby landways and waterways. Archeological and paleontological findings suggest that the place was settled since antiquity. Nearby quarries are also believed to exist since antiquity, supplying stone for building forts and churches in the surrounding area.

History

Medieval Slavonia 

Written sources from 1299 and 1287 indicate that the castle was constructed somewhere throughout the second half of 13th century, when it was owned by Cistercian order. It is then mentioned in 1316 in one charter of king Charles I of Hungary as his property. The castle was a royal property until 1345 it was given by king Louis The Great to Nikola III. Aka - Toth, who supported king Louis in his wars. Nikola III. also gained control over significant possessions in Hrvatsko Zagorje, which would subsequently evolve in what would leter be known as Susedgrad-Stubica Segniory. The family branch which controlled Susedgrad became known as Toths of Susedgrad. Toths however died out, and their last female heir - Doroteja, married to Nicolas Henning, whose family in 1439 took over rights to Aka's possessions.

Early Modern Period 
Hennings held complete control over the castle, until 1502 when they died out, after which several contestants laid claims to the castle through the female line. Legal dispute arose over the question, whether such "female" claims are legal, or does the king owns a right to give the castle to the new owner. In the end, emperor Ferdinand gave one half of the estates to Styrian noble Andrew Teuffenbach who changed his last name to Henning through his mother's line, while he gave another half to Andras Bathory, also a Henning descendant.

Henning-Tahy Wars 

Andrew Teuffenbach - Henning died in 1563, while his wife Ursula Meknitzer Henning lived on. While he was alive, Teuffenbach leased half of his Susedgrad estate to his wife Ursula Meknitzer, while he leased the other part to Andras Batory. Since he was often away in Hungary, Batory sold his complete rights to bith Susedgrad and Stubica to Ferenc Tahy for 50 000 Forints, who thus became a majority owner. Ursula, however, refused to accept Tahy as a rightful owner, while Tahy also refused to give in to Ursula which brought these two nobles into confrontation. Both Ursula and Tahy started gathering powerful allies around them, with Ursula enjoying support of Croatian viceban Ambroz Gregorijanec, while Tahy enjoyed support of Croatian ban Peter Erdody. Ursula made the first move 1565 when she gathered an army of some 800 local peasants had Tahy's family kicked out of the possession. When Croatian ban Petar Erdody gathered Army of Croatian ban to punish her, Ursula and her allies again gathered 3000 strong peasant army and routed Army of Croatian ban in Battle of Susedgrad in July 1565.  The issue was then lifted to Croatian parliament who raised a lawsuit against Ursula, while Royal Chamber confiscated her possessions until the lawsuit is resolved. Tahy was meanwhile brought back in following year, and started to make revenge against local peasants who fought along Ursula against him, and this would eventually escalate in Croatian-Slovene Peasant Revolt of 1573. Since Tahy died same year, Hennings bought back Tahy's part of the estate from his descendants in 1574.

Abandonment 
Historian Stjepan Laljak notes that in 1590, Susedgrad was shaken by a violent earthquake. In the beginning of 17th century, the castle burnt down, and it was later abandoned and left to ruin. One of the main reasons was that there was no need for a large fort since danger from Ottoman akinji incursions diminished. Also, the methods of warfare evolved, making this castle useless.

Contemporary Period 
The castle gave name to today neighbourhood of Podsused, meaning literally "under Sused".

For a while in the late 20th century the name Susedgrad had been used for a city municipality that was dissolved in the 1999 municipal reform and has subsequently been transformed into Podsused - Vrapče and Stenjevec city districts.

Location and access
ZET bus line 123 from Črnomerec terminal is the closest transport to the ruins at the "(Aleja) Seljačke bune" stop.
With a short walk (additional 5 min) from the center of Podsused, it can also be accessed by bus lines 116, 119, 122, 172, 176 and 177, and by HŽ suburban commuter trains directly from the city center.

Gallery

See also 

 Novi Dvori of Zaprešić

References

Neighbourhoods of Zagreb
Ruined castles in Croatia
Castles in Croatia